Fred A. Beell (January 17, 1876 – August 5, 1933) was a German-born American professional wrestler and police officer.

Early life
Fred Beell was born in West Prussia, Province of Prussia on January 17, 1876. When he was three years old, his family migrated to the United States, settling in Marshfield, Wisconsin. He attended Immanual Lutheran School as a child, and at the age of fourteen he began working at the Upham mill in Marshfield. Beell joined the United States Army, serving in the Spanish–American War. He married Anna Scheren on August 6, 1902.

Professional wrestling career
Beell first became a professional wrestler in the late 1890s, during a time when professional wrestlers would fight numerous exhibition matches each month, keeping them on the road constantly.

On February 3, 1900, Beell defeated Ed Adamson, winning $238.50 for the match. On April 9, 1900, Beell defeated William West to become the Northwest Wrestling Champion. It was not until 1906 that he gained national attention, when he defeated Frank Gotch, the reigning American Heavyweight Wrestling Champion. Gotch defeated him 16 days later in Kansas City. He eventually quit wrestling in 1919. After retiring, he became a police officer in Marshfield.

Death
Beell died on August 5, 1933, in the line of duty at around 3 AM. Beell and his partner George Fyksen investigated a break-in at the Marshfield Brewing Company. Suspects were still on the scene. Beell, according to the later report published in the Marshfield News-Herald, and a more in-depth report in a 1933 edition of True Detective Mysteries, waited near the patrol vehicle to watch the exits, while Fyksen entered the building. As he entered, the suspects began firing on Fyksen, who dropped to the ground and avoided injury, while returning fire. Beell, hearing the shots, left the vehicle to go to Fyksen's aid. As he rounded the front of the car, the suspects exited the building, firing as they ran. Four buckshot from a shotgun blast hit Beell in the head, without his being able to return fire, killing him instantly. The suspects then stole the police vehicle, but abandoned it less than a mile away. They had stolen $1,550.00 in the burglary of a safe. Marshfield police chief William Paape organized a posse with Wood County, Wisconsin sheriff Martin Bey. One of the suspects, Edward “Speed” Gabriel, was hit by shots fired from Fyksen in the initial gun battle, his body being located in a shallow grave alongside a roadway in Minnesota the next day. Two other suspects, Joe “Sleepy Joe” Hogan and Elmer Digman were captured. Hogan received 25 years in prison for his part in the murder, while Digman received a life sentence.

Beell was buried at Hillside Cemetery in Marshfield. Beell Stadium, home of the Marshfield Tigers football team, is named after him.

Championships and accomplishments
Cauliflower Alley Club
Posthumous award (2005)
International Professional Wrestling Hall of Fame
Class of 2022
Other titles
World Light Heavyweight Championship (3 times)
American Heavyweight Championship (1 time)
Northwest Championship (1 time)
Wisconsin Athletic Hall of Fame (1972)
Professional Wrestling Hall of Fame
Class of 2018

References

1876 births
1933 deaths
19th-century professional wrestlers
20th-century professional wrestlers
American municipal police officers
American male professional wrestlers
American military personnel of the Spanish–American War
Emigrants from the German Empire to the United States
Male murder victims
American police officers killed in the line of duty
People associated with physical culture
People from the Province of Prussia
People from Marshfield, Wisconsin
People murdered in Wisconsin
Deaths by firearm in Wisconsin
Professional wrestlers from Wisconsin
Military personnel from Wisconsin
United States Army soldiers
Professional Wrestling Hall of Fame and Museum